The 2022–23 Women's Super League season (also known as the Barclays Women's Super League for sponsorship reasons) is the 12th season of the Women's Super League (WSL) since it was formed in 2010. It is the fifth season after the rebranding of the four highest levels in English women's football.

Ahead of the season the top two tiers unveiled a new visual identity, dropping "The FA" from the league names as part of the long term strategy for the leagues to be under new ownership in the future. Due to start on 9 September 2022, the FA postponed all of the weekend's football fixtures following the death of Elizabeth II on 8 September 2022. The first match was instead played the following week on 16 September.

Teams
Twelve teams will contest the 2022–23 Women's Super League season. Liverpool were confirmed as the 2021–22 FA Women's Championship champions on 3 April 2022, ensuring that they would return to the WSL for the first time since the 2019–20 season after a two year absence. On 4 May 2022, founding members Birmingham City were relegated meaning the 2022–23 season is the first WSL season without them.

Stadium changes 
Having spent the previous three seasons at The Hive Stadium following promotion to the WSL in 2019, Tottenham Hotspur relocated to Brisbane Road, home of Leyton Orient, ahead of the 2022–23 season.

In addition, eight of the ten clubs whose women's team play at secondary stadia moved select matches to the club's primary ground throughout the season. This would have included on opening weekend with Brighton & Hove Albion hosting Aston Villa at Falmer Stadium, Chelsea hosting West Ham United at Stamford Bridge, and Tottenham Hotspur hosting Manchester United at Tottenham Hotspur Stadium. With Reading already playing at the Madejski Stadium, it would have meant four of the six openers taking place at the stadium used by their respective clubs' men's team with Everton and Manchester City the only home sides not to do so. However, the opening weekend was postponed along with all other football fixture in the country following the passing of Elizabeth II, meaning the predicted "record breaking start" to the season off the back of Euro 2022 was on hold.

Personnel and kits

Managerial changes

League table

Results

Season statistics

Top scorers

Top assists

Clean sheets

Hat-tricks

Discipline

Awards

Monthly awards

Highest attendances

Top 10 highest attendances

Highest attendances by home team

References

External links
Official website

Women's Super League seasons
1
2022–23 domestic women's association football leagues